Víctor Hugo Giraldo López (born 30 August 1985), is Colombian football defender. He currently plays for Boyacá Chicó in the Categoría Primera A.

References

External links 

1985 births
Living people
People from Itagüí
Colombian footballers
Footballers from Medellín
Categoría Primera A players
La Equidad footballers
Deportes Quindío footballers
Envigado F.C. players
Atlético Nacional footballers
Deportivo Cali footballers
Atlético Huila footballers
Deportes Tolima footballers
Independiente Santa Fe footballers
Deportivo Pasto footballers
Boyacá Chicó F.C. footballers
Association football defenders